Nobody's Wife is a 1937 Mexican drama film directed by Adela Sequeyro.

Cast 
 Adela Sequeyro - Ana María
 Mario Tenorio - Marcelo
 José Eduardo Pérez - Leonardo
 Eduardo González Pliego - Rodolfo
 Joaquín Coss - Mayer
 David Valle González - Stepfather

References

External links 

1937 romantic drama films
Mexican romantic drama films
Mexican black-and-white films
1937 films
1930s Spanish-language films
1930s Mexican films